George E. Barnhardt House is a historic house located near Mocksville, Davie County, North Carolina. It is locally significant as a rare surviving example of a post-bellum brick farmhouse in Davie County.

Description and history 
It was built about 1880, and is a two-story, three bay, brick I-house with a two-story rear ell. It features a center-bay, two-tier, pedimented, front-gable porch supported by thin square posts. The rear ell and attached shed porch retain a 5-V metal roof. A small, frame one-story, gabled addition with weatherboard siding has recently been added to the west side of the rear ell.

It was added to the National Register of Historic Places on May 4, 2009.

References

Houses on the National Register of Historic Places in North Carolina
Houses completed in 1880
Houses in Davie County, North Carolina
National Register of Historic Places in Davie County, North Carolina
I-houses in North Carolina